Milica Rakić (9 January 1996 – 17 April 1999) was a three-year-old Serbian girl who was killed by a cluster munition during the NATO bombing of Yugoslavia.

Biography
Milica Rakić was born in Belgrade on 9 January 1996. Her parents were Žarko and Dušica Rakić. She had an older brother named Aleksa.

Between 9:30 p.m. and 10:00 p.m. on 17 April 1999, three-year-old Rakić was struck by shrapnel while in the bathroom of her second-floor apartment at 8 Dimitrije Lazarov Raša Street, in the Belgrade suburb of Batajnica. Batajnica was repeatedly targeted by NATO during its air campaign against Yugoslavia, which lasted between March and June 1999. Rakić was killed instantly. At the time of her death, she was sitting on a training potty. Five civilians were wounded in the attack.

Rakić's funeral took place on 19 April. The same day, Yugoslavia's Minister of Information Milan Komnenić released a statement attributing her death to "NATO cowards".

Legacy

Rakić was one of 89 children killed during the NATO air campaign, according to Serbian Prime Minister Mirko Cvetković. Rakić's death was widely covered in the Serbian media. Her death was not reported by most major Western news outlets. The final NATO report on the bombing of Yugoslavia made no mention of Rakić's death, even under the category of "special incidents". Human Rights Watch (HRW) investigators visited the site of her death on 7 August 1999, inspected the damage and interviewed eyewitnesses. According to HRW, a cluster munition exploded next to the apartment in which Rakić was living. The incident marked the first NATO use of cluster munitions in Serbia-proper; all prior instances of their use by NATO had been recorded in Kosovo. The Yugoslav Ministry of Health provided HRW with photographic documentation of the incident, which was also included in the book White Book of NATO Crimes in Yugoslavia, published by the Government of Yugoslavia.

Following her death, some sectors of the Serbian public called for Rakić to be canonized as a saint by the Serbian Orthodox Church. In 2000, a monument dedicated to the children killed in the NATO bombing of Yugoslavia was unveiled in Belgrade's Tašmajdan Park. It featured a bronze sculpture of Rakić in front of a marble block inscribed with the words "we were just children" written in Serbian and English. The monument was commissioned by the newspaper Večernje novosti and financed by donations that it had received from its readers. The sculpture was stolen twice, once in 2000 and again in 2001, after which it was never recovered.

In 2004, the Tvrdoš Monastery near the town of Trebinje, in Bosnia and Herzegovina, unveiled a fresco of Rakić which contained an inscription describing her as a neomartyr. At the time, the Serbian Orthodox Church announced that it would only consider canonizing Rakić if her cult gained a widespread following. In 2014, a commemorative fountain was dedicated in Rakić's memory in Batajnica. The following year, a new sculpture of Rakić was unveiled in Tašmajdan Park to replace the one that had previously been stolen. The Little Milica Rakić Park in Batajnica was also established in her memory. The park was subjected to extensive renovations in 2017, financed by Serbia's Ministry of Defence.

See also
Civilian casualties during Operation Allied Force

References

1996 births
1999 deaths
People from Belgrade
1999 in Yugoslavia
April 1999 events in Europe
Civilian casualties in the Kosovo War
People killed during the NATO bombing of Yugoslavia